Arsenie Todiraș (sometimes spelt Toderaș) (born 22 July 1983) is a Moldovan singer, best known for representing Moldova in the Eurovision Song Contest 2006. He grew up in Moldova with his mother, father and younger sister. He was once the youngest member of former boyband O-Zone. He now pursues a solo career in Russia and Romania, under the mononym Arsenie or at times the stage name Arsenium.

Arsenie represented Moldova at the Eurovision Song Contest 2006 with the song "Loca" (Crazy in Spanish) with Natalia Gordienco featuring Connect-R, finishing in 20th place with 22 points.

He took part in the Dansez pentru tine dance contest, the Romanian version of Dancing with the Stars, and took the second place, while the first was given to the Romanian singer Andra.

His first solo album, The 33rd Element, was released in Romania in the summer of 2006.

In 2008 he released the single "Rumadai", reaching the Top 100 in Germany and Austria. With the same single he represented Romania at the Viña del Mar Festival 2014 in Chile, winning the Best Performer place and therefore the Silver Seagull (the best prize granted in the International Contest).

In 2019, he had his first release under his new alias ATIKA PATUM, "Atikapatum", which was an EDM song released on Dimitri Vegas & Like Mike's label Smash The House. In March 2020, he released a follow-up called "Ale-Aleluia"

Discography

Albums
in O-Zone
2002: Number 1
2003: DiscO-Zone
2003: Dragostea Din Tei
Solo
2006: The 33rd Element

Singles
2005: "Love Me, Love Me" (Germany Top 100 No. 33, France Singles Top 100 #36)
2006: "Loca"
2007: "Professional Heartbreakers"
2008: "Wake Up"
2008: "Rumadai" (Germany Top 100 No. 32, Germany Dancefloor Chart No. 1, Austria Top 75 #50)
2009: "Minimum"
2009: "25"
2010: "Исчезни" (Ischezni - Disappear)
2010: "Remember me"
2010: "Nu mă mai căutа"
2010: "Erase it"
2010: "Bang Bang"
2010: "Happy Birthday"
2011: "My Heart"
2012: "I'm Giving Up"
2013: "Aquamarina" (feat. Janyela)
2014: "Do Rassveta" (feat. Sati Kazanova)
2015: "Bella Bella"
2016: "Только с тобой" (Tol'ko s toboy - Only With You)
2016: "What is Love"
2016: "Неземная Ты" ("Nezemnaya Ti" - Unearthly You)
2017: "А он другой, мама" (feat. Mianna) ("A on drugoy, mama" - But he is different, mum)
2017: "Неземная Ты - new edit" (feat. Mianna) ("Nezemnaya Ty - new edit" - Unearthly You - new edit)
2019: "Atikapatum" (as Atika Patum)
2020: "Ale-Aleluia" (as Atika Patum)
2021: "Omanare" (as Atika Patum)
2021: "Umani" (as Atika Patum)

Music videos
2003: "Dragostea Din Tei"
2005: "Love Me, Love Me"
2006: "Loca" (feat. Natalia Gordienco & Connect-R)
2006: "Professional Heartbreakers"
2008: "Wake Up"
2008: "Rumadai"
2009: "Minimum"
2010: "Remember Me"
2010: "Erase It"
2011: "My Heart" (feat. Lena Knyazeva)
2014: "Do Rassveta" (feat. Sati Kazanova)
2015: "Bella Bella"
2016: "Только с тобой" (Tol'ko s toboy - Only With You)
2016: "What is Love"
2017: "А он другой, мама" (feat. Mianna) ("A on drugoy, mama" - But he is different, mum)
2019: "Atikapatum" (as Atika Patum)
2020: "Ale-Aleluia" (as Atika Patum)
2021: "Omanare" (as Atika Patum)
2021: "Umani" (as Atika Patum)

References

External links
 Arsenium's official website
 ATIKA PATUM official youtube channel

1983 births
Living people
21st-century Moldovan male singers
Eurovision Song Contest entrants for Moldova
Eurovision Song Contest entrants of 2006
Moldovan expatriates in Romania
O-Zone members
Musicians from Chișinău